Moylena Ground is a cricket ground in Antrim, Northern Ireland and the home of Muckamore Cricket Club. In 2005, the ground hosted two List A matches in the 2005 ICC Trophy. The first of these was between Denmark and Uganda, which resulted in a Danish victory by 28 runs,  The second saw Canada play Oman, which resulted in 2 wicket victory for Canada.

References

External links
Moylena Ground, Muckamore at CricketArchive

Cricket grounds in Northern Ireland
Antrim, County Antrim
Sports venues in County Antrim